Avanguardia Giovanile Fascista (A.G.F.) was a fascist student youth organization established in the 1920s by the National Fascist Party of Benito Mussolini.

References

Student wings of political parties in Italy
Italian Fascism
Student organizations established in 1921
Organizations disestablished in 1926
1921 establishments in Italy
1926 disestablishments in Italy
Youth wings of fascist parties